Fyli is a town and a municipality in the northwestern part of Attica, Greece. It lies in the northeastern corner of the West Attica regional unit, and is a suburb of Athens. The seat of the municipality is the town Ano Liosia. Within bounds of the town is the ancient Athenian fortress of Phyle.

Municipality
The municipality Fyli was formed at the 2011 local government reform by the merger of the following 3 former municipalities, that became municipal units:
Ano Liosia
Fyli
Zefyri

The municipality has an area of 109.128 km2, the municipal unit 69.281 km2.

History
The village has historically been an Arvanite settlement.

Geography 
Fyli is situated in the southern foothills of the mountains of Parnitha, and northeast of the plain of Eleusis. It is 4 km northeast of Ano Liosia, 8 km northeast of Aspropyrgos and 14 km northwest of Athens city centre. Motorway 6 passes south of the town.

Population

History

A group of Athenian exiles, led by Thrasybulus, seized Phyle in the 404 BC Battle of Phyle. They went on to defeat the Spartan garrison at the Battle of Munichia near Piraeus.

Fyli suffered some damage from the 2007 Greek forest fires.

See also
List of municipalities of Attica

References

 
Municipalities of Attica
Populated places in West Attica
Arvanite settlements